Remey is a surname. Notable people with the surname include:

 Ethel Remey (1895–1979), American actress
 George C. Remey (1841–1929), American admiral
 Mason Remey (1874–1974), American religious leader
 William Butler Remey (1842–1895), American military officer

See also
 USS Remey, United States Navy ship, in service from 1943 to 1963